The Skree Range is a subrange of the Stikine Ranges, located between the Dease River and Eagle River in northern British Columbia, Canada.

References

Skree Range in the Canadian Mountain Encyclopedia

Stikine Ranges